Ida Tin (born 28 May 1979) is a Danish internet entrepreneur and author who is the co-founder and CEO of the women's menstruation-tracking app, Clue. She is credited with coining the term "femtech".

Early life and education
Tin was born and raised in Copenhagen, Denmark. She graduated from the Danish alternative business school, Kaospilot.

Career
Prior to founding Clue, Tin ran a motorcycle tour company based in Denmark with her father. She was with the company for five years and toured locations like Vietnam, the United States, Cuba, Chile, and Mongolia. She later released a book about her experiences called Direktøs which became a Danish bestseller.

In 2013, Tin co-founded the Clue app with Hans Raffauf, Moritz von Buttlar, and Mike LaVigne in Berlin, Germany. Tin began formulating an idea for the app in 2009 as a way to track her own menstrual and fertility cycle. In mid-2015, the app had around 1 million active users. In October 2015, the company raised $7 million in a funding round led by Union Square Ventures and Mosaic Ventures, bringing the total amount of funding up to $10 million.

By November of that year, the number of active users had risen to 2 million representing over 180 countries. In late 2015, Tin worked with Apple to help them develop their own period tracking software for their HealthKit platform. Also in 2015, Tin was named the Female Web Entrepreneur of the Year at the Slush Conference.

In 2016, Tin was credited for coining the term "femtech" to refer to technology designed for women's health. The term to referred to technology that addressed needs related to fertility, period-tracking, pregnancy, menopause and more.

In September 2016, Tin spoke at the TechCrunch Disrupt event in San Francisco on the topic of analytics in women's health. Two months later, Clue raised an additional $20 million in a funding round led by Nokia Growth Partners. In 2016 and 2017, Tin helped introduce new features to the app, including cycle-sharing and pill-tracking. In 2017, Tin announced that Clue was working on adding features to serve app users going through menopause. By 2018, Clue had 10 million users in 190 countries.

Personal life
Tin lives in Berlin. Her ex-partner (and fellow Clue co-founder) is Hans Raffauf whom she has two children with, Elliot and Eleanor.

References

1979 births
Living people
Writers from Copenhagen
21st-century Danish non-fiction writers
21st-century Danish women writers
21st-century Danish inventors
Women inventors
21st-century Danish businesspeople
21st-century Danish businesswomen
Businesspeople from Copenhagen